is an anime series based on the manga of the same name, which in itself is a spin-off of Kazuma Kamachi's light novel, manga and anime series A Certain Magical Index. The manga is serialized in Dengeki Daioh and is written by Kazuma Kamachi and illustrated by Motoi Fukuyama. The anime series is set in Academy City before and during the events of A Certain Magical Index, in which the plot focuses on Mikoto Misaka, an electromaster who is the third strongest esper in Academy City, along with her friends: Kuroko Shirai, a teleporter and Mikoto's roommate; Kazari Uiharu, Kuroko's partner in Judgment, the city's public safety committee; and Ruiko Saten, Kazari's friend and classmate.

The anime is produced by J.C.Staff and directed by Tatsuyuki Nagai, series composition by Seishi Minakami, music by Maiko Iuchi, character design by Yuichi Tanaka and art and sound direction by Tomonori Kuroda and Jin Aketagawa respectively. The anime began airing on Tokyo MX from October 2, 2009 to March 19, 2010 and were later aired a day later on Chiba TV, MBS, TV Saitama and TV Kanagawa. The first 12 episodes follow the manga closely, with some changes and a few anime-original episodes and characters, while the later half of the series being a new original plot written by Kazuma Kamachi. Eight DVD compilations, each containing three episodes and a mini A Certain Magical Index novel written by Kazuma Kamachi and art by Haimura Kiyotaka which features Kaori Kanzaki as the protagonist, were released since February 7, 2010. A five-minute bonus episode was included with the Official Visual Book of the show released on July 24, 2010. An OVA episode was then released on October 29, 2010. Funimation licensed the series in North America and released the series on DVD in April 2013. A second anime season, titled A Certain Scientific Railgun S, aired between April 12, 2013 and September 27, 2013 and was simulcast by Funimation, who released the series on DVD between July and August 2014. Another Visual Book containing another bonus episode was released on March 27, 2014. A third season, titled A Certain Scientific Railgun T, has been announced and premiered on January 10, 2020.

Series overview

Episode list

Season 1 (2009–2010)

Season 2: S (2013)

Season 3: T (2020)

OVAs

Specials
These special episodes are released as extras on DVD and Blu-ray Disc volumes.

Notes

References

Bibliography

External links
 Official website 

Lists of anime episodes
A Certain Magical Index